The Connacht Intermediate Hurling Championship is an inter county competition between the Intermediate Hurling county teams in the province of Connacht in Ireland. The series of games are organised by the Connacht Council.

The winners of the Connacht Intermediate Hurling Championship each year progress to play the other provincial champions for a chance to win the All-Ireland Intermediate Hurling Championship. The competition has not been played since 1999, and Galway has represented the province in the All-Ireland series. The other counties in the province are not strong enough to field a second hurling team for this competition.

Roll of honour

 Galway participated in the Munster Intermediate Hurling Championship between 1961 and 1969.
 In 1966 and 1967, Roscommon represented the province.
 From 1970 to 1972, Galway represented the province.
 In 1999, Galway represented the province in the All-Ireland series. Roscommon took part in the Open Draw section, and they qualified for the All-Ireland semi-final in which they lost to Galway.

See also

Munster Intermediate Hurling Championship
Leinster Intermediate Hurling Championship
Ulster Intermediate Hurling Championship

References

Sources
 Roll of Honour on gaainfo.com
 Complete Roll of Honour on Kilkenny GAA bible

Connacht GAA inter-county hurling competitions